Jan Ebeling (born September 9, 1958) is a German-American equestrian. After Immigrating to the United States in 1984, Ebeling was a well known and prestigious rider in the states until his citizenship in 2002. The next year, Ebeling was named to the United States Pan American Team with mount Feleciano, with his direct reserve horse Liberté (owned by longtime sponsor Ann Romney). The team won Gold, and Ebeling finished 5th individually. He began riding his most famous horse, Rafalca, in 2007. With her, Ebeling competed in 3 World Cup Finals, in Las Vegas (2009), Leipzig (2011), and 'S-Hertogenbosch (2012). The highlight of his career thus far was his appearance on the United States Olympic Team in 2012, in London. In the twilight of her career, Rafalca and Ebeling won Bronze at the Aachen World Equestrian Festival. Ebeling continues to ride at a competitive level, with newer mounts Indeed, Bellena, Zitat, and Status Royal OLD.

Early life
Ebeling was born in Berlin, Germany. He emigrated to the United States in 1984.

Career
He competed for the United States in Individual and Team Dressage at the 2012 Summer Olympics on the horse Rafalca.

International Championship Appearances

Personal life
He is married to Amy Ebeling. They have a son, Ben.

References

1958 births
Living people
American dressage riders
Equestrians at the 2012 Summer Olympics
Olympic equestrians of the United States
American male equestrians
Sportspeople from Berlin
German emigrants to the United States
Equestrians at the 2003 Pan American Games
Pan American Games gold medalists for the United States
Pan American Games medalists in equestrian
Medalists at the 2003 Pan American Games